CJA may refer to:

Center for Justice and Accountability
CanJet, a low-cost chartered airline based in Canada
Criminal Justice Act
Climate Justice Action
CJA, the guitarist from the Futurians
Center for Jewish Art